William Greig Hodson (born 6 November 1982) is an English cricketer.  Hodson is a right-handed batsman who bowls right-arm off break.  He was born in Wakefield, Yorkshire.

While studying for his degree at Durham University, Hodson made a single first-class appearance for Durham UCCE against Nottinghamshire in 2006.  In this match, he was dismissed in the university's first-innings for a duck by Charlie Shreck, while in their second-innings he was dismissed for 29 runs by Graeme Swann.  He also bowled a total of 16 wicket-less overs in this match.

His father, Phillip Hodson, played first-class cricket for Cambridge University. Two of his uncles, brothers Tony and Ian Greig, played Test cricket for England, while another uncle, Norman Curry, played domestically in South Africa.

References

External links
Will Hodson at ESPNcricinfo

1982 births
Living people
Cricketers from Wakefield
Alumni of Durham University
English cricketers
Durham MCCU cricketers
English cricketers of the 21st century